Sargis Martirosjan (born 14 September 1986) is an Austrian Olympian weightlifter. He competed in the men's 105 kg event at the 2016 Summer Olympics held in Rio de Janeiro, Brazil.

He represented Austria at the 2020 Summer Olympics in Tokyo, Japan. He competed in the men's +109 kg event, finishing 10th.

Results

References

External links 
 
 
 

1986 births
Living people
Armenian male weightlifters
Austrian male weightlifters
Weightlifters at the 2016 Summer Olympics
Weightlifters at the 2020 Summer Olympics
Olympic weightlifters of Austria
Austrian people of Armenian descent
European Weightlifting Championships medalists